Deportivo Saprissa is a Costa Rican sports club, mostly known for its football team. The club is based in San Juan de Tibás, San José, and play their home games at the Estadio Ricardo Saprissa Aymá. The team's signature colours are purple (burgundy) and white. It is the main team representing the capital, but with the distinction of being massively followed throughout the whole country and overseas. The club was founded in 1935 and has competed in the Costa Rican first division since 1949. The name of the team comes from one of the club's main founders, Ricardo Saprissa. One of the most popular nicknames for the team  (The Purple Monster) can be traced back to 1987, when the Costa Rican newspaper Diario Extra gave the team the nickname during a derby, because of the club's enormous following. A reporter commented that the sea of fans in the stands at the Estadio Ricardo Saprissa Aymá in Tibás wearing purple, and the tremendous noise they were generating, made him feel like he was "in the presence of a thousand headed monster". Saprissa immediately adopted the nickname . It remains the most lauded football team in the whole region.

Saprissa won 37 Primera División de Costa Rica championships, including six consecutive national titles in the 70s. It stands as one of the more successful teams in the CONCACAF region as well, having won the CONCACAF Champions' Cup three times – in 1993, 1995, and 2005. Saprissa has also won five Central American crowns in 1972, 1973, 1978, 1998, and 2003.

For the period 1 September 2007 to 31 August 2008 the club was ranked the 106th best team in the world by the International Federation of Football History & Statistics, an organization recognized by FIFA.

Saprissa has regularly appeared in the CONCACAF Champions Cup finals in recent decades, with three first-place finishes and four runners-up finishes. One of the club's most notable moments came in 2005 when Saprissa became the second club in CONCACAF to finish third in the FIFA Club World Cup together with the Mexican club Necaxa who accomplished it in 2000 and were joined by two more Mexican clubs, in 2012 by C.F. Monterrey and in 2017 by C.F Pachuca.

The club was chosen by the IFFHS as the CONCACAF team of the 20th Century. This event gave Saprissa worldwide recognition.
Their main partner is a Costa Rican Investment Consortium named Horizonte Morado (Purple Horizon), composed mainly of Juan Carlos Rojas Callán, Edgar Zurcher, and Televisora de Costa Rica.

History

Deportivo Saprissa was founded on 16 July 1935, by Roberto Fernández who named his team after the man who sponsored their uniform, Don Ricardo Saprissa Aymá.  The club entered the Costa Rican Third Division as Saprissa F.C. They were promoted to the Primera División de Costa Rica, making their debut in the top flight on 21 August 1949. That year Saprissa actually won the first final match against Gimnástica Española with 0–3 score, then lost the away game by 6–2 to be defeated again 2–1 in a third game. They were accepted in 1st category as a favor granted by the administrative entity of that time. One of the most notable achievement of their early years, was to win the third and second division titles undefeated. The club has remained in the Costa Rican top flight ever since.

Recent events
In 2003, the majority of the club's stock was bought by Mexican entrepreneur Jorge Vergara, the owner of Mexican football club Club Deportivo Guadalajara and soon after the operator of Major League Soccer club Club Deportivo Chivas USA in the United States.

Saprissa won the 2005 CONCACAF Champions Cup, beating Mexican club UNAM in the final over two legs, in May 2005. As CONCACAF club champions they qualified for the 2005 FIFA Club World Championship, held in Japan in December 2005. They beat Australian club Sydney FC in the quarter-finals thanks to a goal by Christian Bolaños. In the semi-finals they were beaten 3–0 by English club Liverpool, who were the Champions League holders that year, making it the strongest team in Europe. In the third place match they beat Al Ittihad of Saudi Arabia 3–2. Álvaro Saborío scored two goals, and Rónald Gómez scored an astonishing free-kick final goal in the 89th minute to seal the win. After this "late goal" Costa Rican people start calling the late-game goal "La Saprihora" (The Sapritime) in honor to this late goal even though this event happened in 2005 people still using this name for most of the Saprissa goals scored after the minute 85. They finished the competition in third place behind São Paulo of Brazil and Liverpool. Saborío was joint top scorer, and Bolaños was awarded the Bronze Ball by FIFA as third best player of the championship out of 5 teams.

Team colours
Even though the very first colours were red and white, the team is known by their purple-burgundy colour. Red and white were utilised very briefly, and Ricardo Saprissa's influence from the Polo Club of Barcelona had the team try red and blue instead, even though this is the origin of the colour used throughout all of its history. When the new kit for 1937 (red and blue) was being manufactured, some of the threads got mixed evenly along the sides of the jerseys, producing a type of purple, resembling a burgundy/maroon colour. This new colour went down well with everyone involved, it reflected class and originality, and it was selected as the team's official colour. It was decided that the team's shield would appear on the chest of the uniform, with a notable bold white letter "S".

Saprissa utilizes a purple/burgundy jersey with white and grey details, and white shorts with burgundy and grey details for home games. For away games, a white jersey with burgundy and grey details is used, and white shorts with burgundy and grey details.

Kit history

Jersey Suppliers

Stadium

Saprissa plays home games at the Estadio Ricardo Saprissa Aymá named after Ricardo Saprissa. They originally played at the Costa Rica National Stadium, which they rented and shared.

A new site for a stadium was bought in 1965 and on 27 August 1972 after six years of construction and upgrades, Estadio Ricardo Saprissa was officially opened. The first match was between Deportivo Saprissa and Comunicaciones of Guatemala. The match ended in a 1–1 draw with Peter Sandoval of Comunicaciones scoring the first goal at the new stadium.

The stadium is called , named after the founder of the club. There is a bust of Don Ricardo in one of the corners of the stadium. It has a seating capacity of 24,000 and is overlooked by local mountains and downtown San Jose.

The stadium has great fame internationally, especially with all the national teams that play against Costa Rica.

Supporters

 (The Purple Ultra) is the club's most radical supporters group, even though it is not recognized as an official or formal part of the club. This group is always set on the south side of the stadium.
The group was the first Ultras group in Costa Rica, formed in 1995 when then-Saprissa president Enrique Artiñano brought fans from the Chilean football club Universidad Católica to help build a similar ultras group to their  for Saprissa. In the mid-to-late 1990s the Ultras began to develop the image of being football hooligans when violence began to break out with opposition fans during games. Due to the negative atmosphere and press coverage, Saprissa officials stepped in to restore order to a group that they had help create. The group is sub-divided in smaller groups called . They maintain the style of a classic Ultras group, with chants, choreos, pyro shows (flares and gunpowder), abundant flags, giant banners, and the constant beat of an oversized bass drum.

There are, however, several different other supporter group that are legally recognized by the club. These groups occupy different zones in the stadium, and they are mainly groups that get organized with transportation, original merchandise, and massive displays for the team during a game (confetti, balloons, banners, flares, etc.)

Mascot
The official mascot of the team is a cartoonish purple dragon, which was based on the Dragon Elliot from Pete's Dragon, and similar to one from Dragon Tales and many other dragons from children's shows. Because of this, many of the fans call the mascot  which means "a friendly monster". The mascot was meant to appeal to children in general, but it ended up being loved by the entirety of the fans. This caused it to be present in all kinds of paraphernalia and merchandise. It is the most recognizable and appreciated mascot in all the region.
However, in early 2010, a new mascot was introduced. The mascot was designed in Mexico and many club supporters felt that it was a campy, superhero-like purple monster. As a result, the new mascot was highly rejected by the fans, claiming that "" (We don't want a super hero dinosaur, we want the original spirit of the team).
The new mascot was replaced immediately after the strong rejection, and the team now has a new mascot that resembles the original. The new costume was manufactured by Fernando Thiel, a widely recognized Argentina-born puppeteer who lives in Costa Rica.

Honours

National
Primera División de Costa Rica: 37
1952, 1953, 1957, 1962, 1964, 1965, 1967, 1968, 1969, 1972, 1973, 1974, 1975, 1976, 1977, 1982, 1988, 1989, 1993–94, 1994–95, 1997–98, 1998–99, 2003–04, 2005–06, 2006–07, Invierno 2007, Verano 2008, Invierno 2008, 2010 Verano, 2014 Verano, 2014 Invierno, 2015 Invierno, 2016 Invierno, 2018 Clausura, 2020 Clausura, 2021 Clausura, 2022 Apertura

Costa Rican Short Championships: 8
1997–98 Clausura, 1998–99 Apertura, 1998–99 Clausura, 2003–04 Apertura, 2005–06 Apertura, 2005–06 Clausura, 2006–07 Apertura, 2006–07 Clausura

Costa Rican Cup: 6
 1950, 1960, 1963, 1970, 1972, 2013

Costa Rican Super Cup: 3
 1963, 1976, 2021

Segunda División de Costa Rica: 1
 1948

Tercera División de Costa Rica: 1
 1947

International
CONCACAF Champions' Cup: 36 appearances
Winners (3): 1993, 1995, 2005
Runners-up (2): 2004, 2008

CONCACAF League: 3 appearances 
Winners (1): 2019
Runners-up (1): 2020

Central American Club Championship: 17 appearances
Winners (5): 1972, 1973, 1978, 1998, 2003
Runners-up (7): 1971, 1974, 1996, 1997, 2001, 2004, 2007

Copa Interamericana: 2 appearances
Runners-up (2): 1993, 1995

CONCACAF Central American Champions: 1 appearance
Winners (1): 1970

US Camel Cup: 1 appearance
Winners (1): 1985

FIFA World Club Championship: 1 appearance
Third place (1): 2005

CONCACAF League Fair Play:
Winners (1): 2019

Performance in CONCACAF competitions
CONCACAF Champions League: 35 appearances

1963 – Semi-finals
1965 – Final (not continued)
1969 – Semi-finals
1970 – Semi-finals
1971 – Second Round 
1973 – Finalist
1974 – First Round
1975 – Semi-finals 
1977 – Semi-finals 
1978 – Third Round (Quarter-finals)
1983 – First Round
1986 – First Round

1987 – Quarter-finals
1991 – Fourth Round (Quarter-finals)
1992 – First Round
1993 – Champion
1995 – Champion
1996 – Second Round
1998 – Third place
1999 – Quarter-finals
2002 – Round of 16
2004 – Finalist
2005 – Champion
2006 – Semi-finals

2008 – Finalist
2008–09 – Group Stage (Top 16)
2009–10 – Group Stage (Top 16)
2010–11 – Semi-finals
2014–15 – Quarter-finals
2015–16 – Group Stage (Top 24)
2016–17 – Quarter-finals
2018 – Round of 16
2019 – Round of 16
2020 – Round of 16
2021 – Round of 16

CONCACAF League: 3 appearances

2019 – Champion
2020 – Finalist
2021 – Quarter-finals

Records and statistics

Player records

|-

Current squad
As of February 2, 2023

Non-playing staff

List of coaches

  Roberto Fernández "Beto" (1936–47)
  José Francisco García "Pachico" (1947–50)
  Otto Bumbel (1951–53)
  José Francisco García "Pachico" (1953–55)
  Alfredo Piedra "Chato" (1955–56)
  Carlos Peucelle (1957–58)
  Eduardo Viso Abella (1958–61)
  Jorge Thomas (1961)
  Alfredo Piedra "Chato" (1962–64)
  Mario Cordero "Catato" (1964–67)
  José Ramos Costa (1967)
  Mario Cordero "Catato" (1968–70)
  Marvin Rodríguez (1971–76)
  Jozef Karel (1977–79)
  Giovanni Rodríguez (1979–80)
  Marcos Pavlovsky (1980)
  Mario Cordero "Catato" (1980)
  Wálter Elizondo (1981–82)
  Giovanni Rodríguez (1982–83)
  Javier Mascaró (1983)
  José Mattera (1984–85)
  Marvin Rodríguez (1985–86)
  Walter Ormeño (1986)
  Rigoberto Rojas "Feo" (1986)
  Guillermo Hernández "Coco" (1986–87)
  Raúl Higinio Bentancor (1987–88)
  Josef Bouska (1988–91)
  Odir Jacques (1991)
  Rolando Villalobos (1991–92)
  Odir Jacques (1992–93)
  Fabrizio Poletti (1993)
  Julio César Cortés "Pocho" (1993)
  Carlos Watson (1993–94)
  Carlos Linaris (1994–95)
  Luis García "Chiqui" (1995–96)
  Carlos Watson (1996)
  Jorge Olguín (1996–97)
  Alexandre Guimarães (1997–99)
  Carlos Santana (1999)
  Jorge Flores (1999)
  Alexandre Guimarães (1999–00)
  Miguel Company (2000)
  Jorge Flores (2000)
  Valdeir Vieira "Badú" (3 Nov 2000–01)
  Evaristo Coronado (2001)
  Enrique Rivers (2001)
  Patricio Hernández (2001–02)
  Vladimir Quesada (2002)
  Manuel Keosseian (10 May 2002 – 30 June 2003)
  Hernán Medford (1 July 2003 – 30 October 2006)
  Jeaustin Campos (1 July 2007 – 2 November 2009)
  Roy Myers (1 Jan 2010 – 31 December 2010)
  Juan Manuel Álvarez (1 Jan 2011 – 30 June 2011)
  Alexandre Guimarães (1 July 2011 – 31 May 2012)
  Daniel Casas (1 July 2012 – 31 December 2012)
  Rónald González Brenes (1 Jan 2013 – 30 September 2014)
  Jeaustin Campos (30 September 2014 – 17 September 2015)
  Douglas Sequeira (18 September 2015 – 15 October 2015)
  Carlos Watson (15 Oct 2015 – 17 December 2017)
  Vladimir Quesada (18 Dec 2017 – 3 February 2019)
  Walter Centeno (3 Feb 2019 – 7 February 2021)
  Roy Myers (8 Feb 2021 – 18 April 2021)
  Mauricio Wright (20 Apr 2021 – 9 November 2021)
  Iñaki Alonso (10 Nov 2021 – 13 Jul 2022)
  Jeaustin Campos (14 Jul 2022 – Present)

See also
CONCACAF Champions' Cup and Champions League records and statistics
List of Deportivo Saprissa players

References

https://www.rsssf.org/tabless/saprissa-intl.html
https://www.rsssf.org/tablesf/fraternidad.html
https://www.rsssf.org/tablesc/ca2.html
https://web.archive.org/web/20160112090854/http://www.rsssf.com/tablesc/ca1.html
https://www.rsssf.org/tablesu/uncaf-club.html

External links

 

 
Saprissa
Association football clubs established in 1935
1935 establishments in Costa Rica
S
S
S